A dory is a small, shallow-draft boat, about  long. It is usually a lightweight boat with high sides, a flat bottom and sharp bows. It is easy to build because of its simple lines. For centuries, the dory has been used as a traditional fishing boat, both in coastal waters and in the open sea.

Definition
Strictly speaking, the only true defining characteristic of the dory is that it is planked with wide straight boards running fore-and-aft; "It should be well understood, that it is the dory's special mode of construction, not its hull shape, that sets it, and its related sub-types apart from other boats". More generally speaking, the dory can be defined as a small boat which has:
 a flat bottom, with the bottom planks fastened lengthwise (bow to stern).
 a hull shape defined by the natural curve of a sawn plank (never steam-bent).
 planks overlapping the stem at the front of the boat and an outer "false" stem covering the hood ends of the planks.
 (with some exceptions) a fairly narrow transom often referred to as the "tombstone" due to its unique shape.

The hull's bottom is transversely flat and usually bowed fore-and-aft. (This curvature is known as "rocker".) The stern is frequently a raked narrow transom that tapers sharply toward the bottom forming a nearly double-ended boat. The traditional bottom is made from planks laid fore and aft and not transverse, although some hulls have a second set of planks laid over the first in a pattern that is crosswise to the main hull for additional wear and strength.

Despite their simplicity of design, dories were known for their seaworthiness and rowing ease, although this reputation owed more to the skill of the operators than inherent factors in the design. Because of their narrow flat bottoms, they have little initial stability and are "tippy". Traditionally, they were designed to carry large amounts of wet fish — often over a ton. They were commonly rowed by experienced seamen who understood the characteristics of the design and could compensate for the limitations. Dories exhibit high ultimate stability, tipping to a point and then stiffening up significantly and resisting further heel. By design they are quite voluminous and can carry a heavy load for their size. Their high sides give ample freeboard even when heavily loaded, and as the load increases, so does the stability.

History

With no clear definition of the type, and few early illustrations or detailed descriptions to go by, the early history of the dory is muddled at best. The first known mention of a dory in detail was in 1719. Until about 1870, there are to be found no recorded dory lines, details, nor any list of particulars that would enable us to say with certainty what the earlier dories were really like." In its most popular form, the dory was created in New England fishing towns sometime after the early 18th century. Howard Chapelle writes, "... some kind of dory boat was in use on the Massachusetts coast as early as 1726." A definite precursor to the dory type was the early French bateau type, a flat bottom boat with straight sides used as early as 1671 on the Saint Lawrence River. The common coastal boat of the time was the wherry and the merging of designs between the wherry type and the simplified flat bottom construction of the bateau initiated the birth of the dory. Other anecdotal evidence exists of much older precursors throughout Europe. England, France, Belgium, and Italy all have small boats from the medieval periods that could reasonably be construed to be predecessors of the Dory.

Dories were widely built from Long Island Sound to Newfoundland.

In Nova Scotia, the towns of Lunenburg and Shelburne maintained a rivalry in mass production of dories. A distinction emerged in 1887 with the use in Shelburne of "dory clips", metal braces used to join frames, versus the more expensive but stronger natural wood frames used in Lunenburg dories. The John Williams Dory Shop in Shelburne was one of several Shelburne factories mass-producing dories. It is now the Dory Shop Museum, operated by the Nova Scotia Museum and continues to produce banks dories.

The Dory Shop in Lunenburg first opened its doors in 1917 when W. Laurence Allen began building Banks Dories for the many fishing schooners that filled Lunenburg's Harbour. Though ownership has changed hands a few times since then, they are still producing dories today using the very same jigs and patterns used 100 years ago. Very little has changed in the way they build their dories, however they now also build many other types of wooden boats as well and offer dory building classes for fishing history enthusiasts.

Today many Hollywood producers have employed the iconic form of the dory and they are choosing to use a traditional dory over many of the modern-styles of small wooden boats. Some more notable appearances of Lunenburg dories are in Pirates of the Caribbean: Curse of the Black Pearl, at the opening scene when Captain Jack Sparrow steps off the mast of his ship Jolly Mon; the final scene in Pirates of the Caribbean: At World’s End where Captain Jack is seen sailing away in a smaller Black Rocks dory; Reign III when King Francis and Queen Mary take a few days alone to sail together; Pirate Master Emmy Award-winning producer Mark Burnett's tall ship based reality TV show; and many more!

Traditional types

Beach dories

The earliest known dories were beach dories developed for beach-launched fishing operations. The principal example is the Swampscott dory, named after Swampscott, Massachusetts where they were introduced. Early wherry types were modified with flat bottoms and borrowed construction techniques found in the French bateaus. This resulted in an almost-round-sided boat with a narrow flat bottom, well suited to launching through the surf and able to hold up against aggressive ocean conditions. The narrow "tombstone" transom assured that the boat rode well against a following sea or breaking surf, and also made the boat easy to row.

Banks dories

It is often assumed that the Banks dory was the original dory. In fact, the Swampscott dory preceded the Banks dory by fifty years. The Banks dories first appeared in the 1830s and were probably the most numerous at their height of popularity. They were "designed specifically as a ships boat but it became so well known and so common a type that it not only was used alongshore but influenced the design of some local fishing boats".  Adapted almost directly from the low-freeboard French river bateaus, with their straight sides and removable thwarts, bank dories could be nested inside each other and stored on the decks of fishing schooners, for their trip to the Grand Banks and other fishing banks. They are not as handy or easy to row as the slightly more complicated Swampscott dories but were mass-produced in much larger numbers. Banks dories were also popular as work boats.

Sailing dories
As the need for working dories diminished, the Swampscott or beach dory types were modified for pleasure sailing. These sailing dories became quite popular at the beginning of the 20th century around the town of Marblehead, Massachusetts. They were generally longer, yet remained narrow with low freeboard and later were often decked over. Another common distinctive feature of the sailing dory was a long boom on the rig that angled up with a mainsail that was larger along the foot than the luff. The Townclass, a sailboat still raced today, is a late example of a sailing dory. Earlier types were the Beachcomber and Alpha series, built by the famed dory builder William Chamberlain, and raced extensively in Salem and Marblehead between 1900 and 1910.
Few of the original Chamberlain-designed dories remain intact. An original Alpha dory can be seen at the Marblehead Historical Museum in Marblehead, Massachusetts.

River dories

The western river dory, though sharing features with sea dories, is adapted for a different place and purpose. The key differentiating features are wider beam, more flare to prevent waves coming on board, and extensive built-in buoyancy/storage areas with water-resistant hatches to shed water and keep the boat afloat in the event of a capsize. The first small flat bottomed dory run of note on the Colorado River was made by Ramon Montez and George Flavell on an 1896 river cruise from Green River, Wyoming, through the Grand Canyon to Temple Bar, Arizona. Western river dories have additional special features such as strong rowlocks, long oars, and long blade oars to operate in the highly aerated waters in rapids. In rapids the master rower faces down river to see the rock and or hydraulic obstacles. In a rapid the oars are often used to steer the boat as well as to propel it. The first documentation of this "stern first" technique in Grand Canyon was by George Flavell in 1896. Credit for the "stern first" technique is often given to Nathaniel Galloway who used it on his cruise through Grand Canyon a few months after the Flavell-Montez cruise.

Motor dories
With the introduction of the outboard motor the "semi-dory" or "half-dory" was developed. Because typical dory bottoms are so narrow, the thrust of an outboard motor pushes the stern of the dory down creating a very unstable and inefficient boat. The semi-dory is basically a Swampscott dory with the stern widened and the rocker straightened aft to support the thrust of the outboard motor.

Other dories, and related types
Other, less but traditional types were the double ended surf and gunning dories. The pointed bow and sterns made these boats excel at launching through the surf. Gunning dories were built quite light in comparison to the more traditionally constructed beach dories.

The "dory skiff" is another variation of the dory type. For inshore work the transom was widened, and freeboard was lowered making an exceptionally easy-to-row boat that was more stable (initial stability not ultimate stability) than their offshore cousins. However, they are not as seaworthy as the Swampscott or Banks dories.

The Gandelow, much like a dory design from midships forward, is native to the Shannon estuary in Ireland. The main difference is that, at the stern, the gandelow has upper 'butterfly planks' which are twisted to make the stern wider and more buoyant, while the lower planks, twisted opposite, form a hollow boxed skeg, much like a Sea Bright Skiff. The space created, when covered, provides a netlocker and a platform.

The cot, a protean Irish traditional boat, has variants quite similar to dories, although some have a transom bow as well as stern, resembling a jonboat. (The boat name originated as a word for an open dugout canoe, coit, but became used for many types of small open boats.)

The dory type spread by contact among fishing fleets, and was naturalized in many countries.

Modern interpretations

In recent years there has been a resurgence of interest in the dory style. Many contemporary marine architects and backyard amateurs have been experimenting with the dory type and refining the type to some extent. These boats are designed primarily for pleasure and use new building materials and techniques not available to the originators of the dory. The basic form remains ensuring the survival and growth of the type. New England is no longer the center of dory construction and dories have been built all over the world. Modern dory designers include Phil Bolger of Gloucester and John Welsford of New Zealand.

They are much lighter than traditional dories and compensate for the lack of initial stability by having slightly wider bottoms and very low [ high] seats and are fitted with skegs for directional stability. Welsford recommends the carrying of a water container on a rope that can be thrown to the bow or stern to adjust trim in different sea conditions. Unlike a conventional wide bottom dinghy it is dangerous to sit or stand in the extreme ends due to the minimal displacement. Modern designs, like their traditional counterparts, gain significant stability when heavily laden amidships.

Notes

References
 Chapelle, Howard L. (1951), American Small Sailing Craft, WW Norton and Company, New York, London. .
 Gardner, John (1987), The Dory Book. Mystic Seaport Museum, Mystic Connecticut. .
 Marston, Otis (2014), From Powell to Power, Vishnu Temple Press, Flagstaff, Arizona. .
 Martin, Tom (2012), Big Water Little Boats, Vishnu Temple Press, Flagstaff, Arizona. . p. 101
 Walker, David A. and Wayne Barrett (1990), Small Wooden Boats of the Atlantic, Halifax, NS: Nimbus (1990)

Further reading
 Brewer, Ted (1993). Understanding Boat Design. McGraw-Hill Professional. . pp. 10–12.
 Gardner, John (1996). Building Classic Small Craft I & II. International Marine/McGraw-Hill, Camden, ME. .
 Molyneaux, Paul (2006). The Doryman's Reflection: A Fisherman's Life. Thunder's Mouth Press. .

External links

 The Dory Shop
 Dan's Dories (modern and historical dories)
 www.buildyourowndoryboat.info (Build Your Own Dory Boat)
 Dory Builder  Documentary produced by Oregon Field Guide

Types of fishing vessels
Boat types